Benjamin Jennings Caddy (November 1881 – 13 March 1955) was an Australian-born South African trade unionist.

Born in Ballarat, Caddy emigrated to South Africa in 1898.  The Second Boer War broke out soon after, and Caddy fought on the British side.  After the war, he worked as a boilermaker, and 1904 joined the UK-based United Society of Boilermakers.  He became prominent during strikes held in 1913 and 1914, and in 1916 he was a leading founder of the new South African Boilermakers' Society (SABS).  In 1920, he was elected as general secretary of the union, serving until 1950.

In 1919, Caddy was part of a group of workers who seized control of the Johannesburg municipal services, and attempted to run them.  He was also prominent in the 1922 Rand Rebellion, and was imprisoned for a time.  In 1929, he attended the International Labour Organization conference in Geneva, as an advisor to Bill Andrews.  He helped found the Mining Unions Joint Committee, chairing it from 1939 until 1951.  He also founded and chaired the South African Trade Union Building Society, and was vice-chair of the South African Trade Union Assurance Society.

Caddy supported South African involvement in World War II, serving on the Munitions Production Committee and the Manpower Control Board.  In 1954, he played a leading role in founding the Trade Union Council of South Africa, and was made its life president.  In 1953, he was awarded the Coronation Medal.

References

1881 births
1955 deaths
Australian emigrants to South Africa
People from Ballarat
South African trade union leaders